The 2017 Boys' Youth Pan-American Volleyball Cup was the second edition of the bi-annual Continental Cup, played by nine countries from March 20–25, 2017 in Monterrey, Mexico. Mexico won the tournament beating Chile in the finals. The two former teams along with Puerto Rico have qualified for the U19 World Championship

Competing Nations

Preliminary round
All times are in Central Standard Time (UTC−06:00)

Group A

Group B

Group C

Final round

Championship bracket

Quarterfinals

Semifinals

Ninth place match

Seventh place match

Fifth place match

Bronze medal match

Final

Final standing

J. Flores,
R. Stephens,
M. Sarabia,
J. Cabrera,
L. Hernández,
D. González,
S. Ramírez,
A. Téllez,
G. Gardea,
B. Estrada,
J. Cabrera,
D. González

Individual awards

Most Valuable Player

Best Scorer

Best Setter

Best Server

Best Outside Hitters

Best Middle Blockers

Best Opposite

Best Libero

Best Receiver

Best Digger

References

Men's Pan-American Volleyball Cup
2017 in men's volleyball
International volleyball competitions hosted by Mexico
2017 in Mexican sports
March 2017 sports events in Mexico